Politico is an American news media company.

Politico may also refer to:
Politico (album) by Mexican Institute of Sound
Colloquially, a politician or political operative.

See also
Politico's Publishing, an imprint of Methuen Publishing
Politico-media complex, interaction between media and government
Politics (disambiguation)